Sid Meier's Ace Patrol: Pacific Skies is a WWII combat flight simulation game developed by Firaxis Games and published by 2K Games for Microsoft Windows (Steam) and iOS in 2013. It is the sequel to Sid Meier's Ace Patrol.

Reception

The iOS version received "favorable" reviews, while the PC version received "mixed" reviews, according to the review aggregation website Metacritic.

References

External links
 

2013 video games
2K games
Combat flight simulators
Firaxis Games games
iOS games
Ace Patrol
Video games developed in the United States
Video game sequels
Windows games
World War II video games